Głębocko  is a village in the administrative district of Gmina Murowana Goślina, within Poznań County, Greater Poland Voivodeship, in west-central Poland.

The village has an approximate population of 80. It is situated near the western edge of the forests of the Puszcza Zielonka Landscape Park, close to a series of lakes on the Trojanka stream.

References

Villages in Poznań County